Princess Frederica Caroline of Saxe-Coburg-Saalfeld, Duchess in Saxony was a princess of Saxe-Coburg-Saalfeld by birth and, through marriage, the last Margravine of Brandenburg-Ansbach and Bayreuth.

Biography 
Frederica Caroline was the fifth child and youngest daughter of Franz Josias, Duke of Saxe-Coburg-Saalfeld and Princess Anna Sophie of Schwarzburg-Rudolstadt (1700–1780), daughter of Louis Frederick I, Prince of Schwarzburg-Rudolstadt.

Marriage 
On  in Coburg, she married Margrave Karl Alexander of Brandenburg-Ansbach and Bayreuth (1736-1806). The marriage was concluded for dynastic reasons. Although Frederica Caroline was considered virtuous, gentle, charitable and devout, her husband found her ugly, ignorant and boring. The marriage remained childless, he separated from his wife, who by that time lived at Schwaningen Castle in Unterschwaningen, and began to live with his mistress Elizabeth Craven.

Frederica Caroline's brother, Prince Josias of Saxe-Coburg-Saalfeld, owed his sister admission to the regiment as captain, this starting point of his brilliant military career.

Death 
After Frederica Caroline's death, her husband abdicated as Margrave and sold the Margravate to Prussia, he left the country and married his English mistress that year.

Ancestry

References

External links

|-

1735 births
1791 deaths
German duchesses
House of Wettin
Margravines of Brandenburg
People from Coburg
Princesses of Saxe-Coburg-Saalfeld
Daughters of monarchs